Alcidion alienum is a species of longhorn beetles of the subfamily Lamiinae. It was described by Melzer in 1932, and was discovered in Brazil.

References

Beetles described in 1932
Alcidion